Lakan (also Romanized as Lakān; also known as Lagān, Lākhaūn, and Lākhūn) is a village in Khorram Dasht Rural District, Kamareh District, Khomeyn County, Markazi Province, Iran. At the 2006 census, its population was 870, in 256 families.

References 

Populated places in Khomeyn County